Gessius is a genus of leafhoppers in  the family Cicadellidae. There are 10 described species in Gessius.

Species
Gessius curvatus Wang & Li, 1997
Gessius furcatus Wang & Li, 1997
Gessius helvus Schmidt, 1920
Gessius malayensis Baker, 1919
Gessius nigridorsus Li & Wang, 2002
Gessius pallidus Baker, 1919
Gessius rufidorsus Wang & Li, 1997
Gessius similis Schmidt, 1920
Gessius strictus Wang & Li, 1997
Gessius verticalis Distant, 1908

References

Cicadellidae
Hemiptera genera